{{DISPLAYTITLE:GABAA receptor negative allosteric modulator}}
A GABAA receptor negative allosteric modulator is a negative allosteric modulator (NAM), or inhibitor, of the GABAA receptor, a ligand-gated ion channel of the major inhibitory neurotransmitter γ-aminobutyric acid (GABA). They are closely related and similar to GABAA receptor antagonists. The effects of GABAA receptor NAMs are functionally the opposite of those of GABAA receptor positive allosteric modulators (PAMs) like the benzodiazepines, barbiturates, and ethanol (alcohol). Non-selective GABAA receptor NAMs can produce a variety of effects including convulsions, neurotoxicity, and anxiety, among others.

Flumazenil is a competitive antagonist of the benzodiazepine site of the GABAA receptor and hence is a GABAA receptor NAM of sorts. It is used to reverse benzodiazepine overdose. The drug can provoke seizures in those with benzodiazepine dependence.

Selective NAMs (or "inverse agonists") of α5 subunit-containing GABAA receptors, such as basmisanil and α5IA, do not have convulsant or anxiogenic effects but instead show cognitive- and memory-enhancing or nootropic-like effects. They are under investigation for the treatment of cognitive impairment in conditions like Down syndrome and schizophrenia. In addition, the selective α5 subunit-containing GABAA receptor NAMs L-655,708 and MRK-016 have been found to produce rapid-acting antidepressant effects in animals similar to those of the NMDA receptor antagonist ketamine, and are of interest for the potential treatment of depression. Additional selective α5 subunit-containing GABAA receptor NAMs include PWZ-029, Ro4938581, and TB-21007.

Certain drugs show weak GABAA receptor NAM activity as an off-target activity that is responsible for undesirable side effects like anxiety, insomnia, and seizures. Examples include fluoroquinolone antibiotics like ciprofloxacin, β-lactam antibiotics like penicillin, ceftriaxone, and imipenem, nonsteroidal antiandrogens like enzalutamide and apalutamide, and the antidepressant bupropion.

Other GABAA NAMs, mostly non-selective, include amentoflavone, bemegride, bilobalide, cicutoxin, dieldrin, FG-7142, fipronil, flurothyl, iomazenil, laudanosine, lindane, oenanthotoxin, pentylenetetrazol, phenylsilatrane, picrotoxin, radequinil, Ro15-4513, sarmazenil, suritozole, terbequinil, tetramethylenedisulfotetramine (TETS), and ZK-93426 as well as the endogenous neurosteroids dehydroepiandrosterone sulfate (DHEA-S), pregnenolone sulfate, epipregnanolone, and isopregnanolone. Some naturally occurring GABAA receptor NAMs like cicutoxin and picrotoxin are considered to be toxins, while other GABAA receptor NAMs like dieldrin, fipronil, and TETS are used as pesticides (e.g., insecticides, rodenticides), and yet other GABAA receptor NAMs like bemegride, flurothyl, and pentylenetetrazol are used for clinical purposes.

See also
 GABAA receptor positive allosteric modulator
 AMPA receptor positive allosteric modulator
 List of investigational antidepressants

References

Convulsants
GABAA receptor negative allosteric modulators
Pesticides